The Gulf of Gorgan, also known as Gorgan Bay, is the largest gulf in the Caspian Sea. It is located at the south-eastern shore of the Caspian Sea near the cities of Behshahr, Gorgan and Sari in Iran and is separated from the main water body by the Miankaleh peninsula and extends until the Ashuradeh peninsula.

The gulf and the peninsula form a wetland of about 100,000 ha with a maximum depth of 2 m in the bay. The elevation varies between 18 m and 25 m below sea level.

Due to evaporation and lack of water inflow, the gulf and the marshland suffer from increasing silting, with adverse effect to local marine life and economy. Inflow of freshwater from rivers such as the Qarasu reduces salinity, with the additional effect of the water becoming muddier. According to a member of the Caspian Sea National Research Center, the gulf will have vanished by 2025 " if no efficient remedial measure is adopted".

References 

Bays of the Caspian Sea